The karnal (Nepali:कर्नाल) is a large, straight brass trumpet, over a metre long, played in parts of Northern India and Nepal. It has a prominent bell resembling a datura flower. It is used on ceremonial occasions, such as the processions of village deities. It is often included among the five instruments of the Nepali pancai baja ensemble.

See also
Karnay

References

Music of Himachal Pradesh
Trumpets of Nepal
Indian musical instruments
Natural horns and trumpets